Ronald A. Burke (born September 27, 1963) is an American news and sports anchor/reporter/host. He has worked for Comcast SportsNet Philadelphia, NBA TV, and WPBF-TV (West Palm Beach, FL). He also anchored and reported sports news at WBIS-TV (New York, NY), WTVR-TV (Richmond, VA) and WHSV-TV (Harrisonburg, VA). In January 2021, Burke left WPBF to anchor news and sports for KOAT-TV in Albuquerque, NM.

WPBF-TV
Prior to 2018, Burke worked exclusively in sports. He made a transition to news that year when he joined WPBF TV, the ABC affiliate in West Palm Beach, Florida, as weekend morning anchor and weekday reporter.

References

External links
 Ron Burke Biography at NBA.COM (Archived)

James Madison University alumni
African-American television personalities
National Basketball Association broadcasters
Living people
1963 births
People from Richmond, Virginia
American soccer commentators
Major League Soccer broadcasters
Journalists from Virginia
21st-century African-American people
20th-century African-American people